Lluís Llach i Grande (born 7 May 1948) is a Catalan singer-songwriter, novelist and politician from Spain. He is one of the main representatives of the nova cançó genre and an outspoken advocate of the right to self-determination of Catalonia. His most famous song, "L'Estaca", has become the unofficial anthem of the Catalan independence movement. He was a member of the Catalan Parliament from September 2015 until January 2018.

Music 
He is one of the main representatives of nova cançó (New Song), a movement of musicians, and singers who defied Francisco Franco's dictatorship by singing political songs in Catalan during a time where the language, and other cultural manifestations of Catalan identity were allowed although Castillian was the official language in public institutions; nonetheless, on January 23, 1973, TVE aired the show Lluís Llach, in Catalan languague, shot various locations in Gerona province. His famous song "L'Estaca" about a rotten stick about to fall was clear enough as an image of the regime. As many other singers, writers and politically involved artists, Llach left Spain and lived in voluntary exile in Paris until the death of the dictator.

Though partially dependent on arrangers, like Manel Camp or Carles Cases in his early works, Llach's songwriting has largely evolved from the more basic early compositions to a vastly more complex harmonic and melodic writing. Self-taught as a guitarist, Llach only strums simple chords on guitar.  As a pianist, he shows a good knowledge of the European song tradition from Schubert to Hahn with touches of Satie ("Nounou") and his local imitators like Mompou and Manuel Blancafort ("A la taverna del mar").  Llach has used salsa piano patterns ("Terra") and jazzy whole-step block modulations ("El jorn dels miserables") and progressions ("Cançó d'amor a la llibertat").  Some early songs depicted some inspiration from Baroque dances ("Laura", "Jo sé", "Vinyes verdes vora el mar") and ostinato chord patterns ("Non", "Somniem"). Among his influences as singer, Llach has recognized Mahalia Jackson and Jacques Brel.

His lyrics can range from the most traditionally romantic songs, to more complex, philosophical song-cycles and also to some more ironic, politically based compositions, with a more upbeat tempo.  Sea and vitalistic attitude in face of death are two of his cherished topics. When he doesn't write the lyrics of his songs he puts music to a variety of poets, including Constantine P. Cavafy, Màrius Torres, Josep Maria de Segarra, Pere Quart and, perhaps more often than with any of the others, Miquel Martí i Pol.
 
Llach has occasionally performed as a classical baritone, including a series of performances of Gabriel Fauré's Requiem, and has also been a wine producer. He marked his retirement as front man in music with a farewell concert in Verges (March 2007), in Baix Empordà on the Costa Brava, the village in which he grew up.  Afterwards, he has performed incidental music for theatre pieces.

His 1968 song "L'Estaca" has become the anthem of numerous freedom and political movements, including Solidarność in Poland, the Tunisian Revolution, the Indignados or Occupy movement in Spain, and the Catalan independence movement, regularly sung by crowds at demonstrations.

Politics

Llach is a supporter of Catalan independence and the left-wing party ERC. He stood for election in the parliamentary elections of September 2015, as an independent candidate in the Junts pel Sí (Together for Yes) pro-independence alliance. He headed the alliance's list for Girona, one of the four constituencies, and was elected.
The coalition got 11 out of 17 seats in Girona.

In 2021, Llach endorsed the left-wing, pro-independence CUP citing the issue of healthcare.

Controversial statements
In July 2017, Lluis Llach stated that civil servants in Catalonia who continued to follow Spanish law after a future declaration of independence would be "penalised".

On 7 October 2017, prior to the anti-independence unionist demonstration the following day, he tweeted: "Tomorrow let's leave the streets of Barcelona empty. Let the vultures find no food"

Personal life

Llach is openly gay. During the trial of Catalonia independence leaders in 2019, he protested being asked to answer questions from the lawyers of the far-right party Vox, "as a homosexual and pro-independence citizen, and aspiring citizen of the world."

Discography
 Els èxits de Lluís Llach (1969)
 Ara i aquí (1970)
 Com un arbre nu (1972)
 Lluís Llach a l'Olympia (1973)
 L'Estaca (1973)
 I si canto trist... (1974)
 Viatge a Itaca (1975)
 Barcelona, gener de 1976 (1976)
 Campanades a morts (1977)
 El meu amic, el mar (1978)
 Somniem (1979)
 Verges 50 (1980)
 I amb el somriure, la revolta (1982)
 T'estimo (1984)
 Maremar (1985)
 Camp del Barça, 6 de juliol de 1985 (1985)
 Astres (1986)
 Geografia (1988)
 La forja de un rebelde (1990)
 Torna aviat (1991)
 Ara, 25 anys en directe (1992)
 Un pont de mar blava (1993)
 Rar (1994)
 Porrera (1995)
 Nu (1997)
 9 (1998)
 Temps de revoltes (2000)
 Jocs (2002)
 Junts (2003)
 Poetes (2004)
 Que no s'apague la llum (2005)
 i... (2006)
 Verges 2007 (2007)

Bibliography 
Memòria d'uns ulls pintats (2012)
Estimat Miquel (2014)
Les dones de la Principal (2014)
El noi del Maravillas (2017)
Escac al destí (2020)

Literature about Lluís Llach 
Pep Blay's Lluís Llach (Col·lecció "Los Autores", SGAE, Barcelona, 1995) is a biography about the Catalan musician and songwriter Llach, which contains an interesting chronology, a collection of pictures, an anthology of songs and a discography.

Awards and Distinctions 

 1982: Creu de Sant Jordi
 2013: Euskadi de Plata prize for the Spanish translation of Memòria d'uns ulls pintats.
 2013: Premi de Narrativa Maria Àngels Anglada for Memòria d'uns ulls pintats.
 2016: Prix Méditerranée for Les yeux fardés (French translation of Memòria d'uns ulls pintats).
 2017: Doctor Honoris Causa per la Universitat de Girona
 2020: Medalla d'Or de la Generalitat

References

External links 
Official website (in Catalan and Spanish)

1948 births
Living people
People from Girona
Catalan-language singers
Spanish male singer-songwriters
Spanish male novelists
Musicians from Catalonia
Composers from Catalonia
Members of the 11th Parliament of Catalonia
20th-century Spanish male singers
21st-century Spanish male singers
20th-century Spanish male writers
21st-century Spanish male writers
20th-century Spanish novelists
21st-century Spanish novelists
Gay singers
Gay songwriters
Gay novelists
Gay politicians
Spanish gay musicians
Spanish gay writers
Spanish LGBT singers
Spanish LGBT songwriters
Spanish LGBT novelists
Spanish LGBT politicians
20th-century Spanish LGBT people
21st-century Spanish LGBT people
Catalan Anti-Francoists